Honington railway station was a station in the village of Honington, Lincolnshire. It was located on the line Grantham and Lincoln railway line from Grantham to Sleaford and Skegness, at the junction with the branch to Lincoln. It was closed for regular services on 10 September 1962 but was used occasionally until 1965. The disused platforms are still in situ.

References

Disused railway stations in Lincolnshire
Former Great Northern Railway stations
Railway stations in Great Britain opened in 1857
Railway stations in Great Britain closed in 1962
1857 establishments in England
1962 disestablishments in England